This is a list of the 12 members of the European Parliament for Lithuania in the 2009 to 2014 session.

List

Notes

External links
 Lithuanian Central Electoral Commission results website in English, accessed 19 June 2009

Lithuania
List
2009